Ansoumana Sané (born 25 May 1996) is a Senegalese football player. He also holds Italian citizenship. He is under contract with Chievo.

Club career
He made his Serie C debut for Pro Piacenza on 31 August 2014 in a game against Grosseto.

References

External links
 

1996 births
Sportspeople from Thiès
Living people
Senegalese footballers
U.S. Città di Pontedera players
U.S. Viterbese 1908 players
Aurora Pro Patria 1919 players
Serie C players
Senegalese expatriate footballers
Expatriate footballers in Italy
Association football defenders